The GAERS or Genetic Absence Epilepsy Rat from Strasbourg is a recognized animal model of absence epilepsy, a typical childhood form of epilepsy characterized by recurrent loss of contact and concomitant pattern on the electroencephalogram called "spike-and-wave" discharges. It was first characterized in Strasbourg in the 1980s and since then has been used by different international research groups to understand the mechanisms underlying absence seizures and their ontogeny, using different techniques.

History 
In the 1980s the research group of Marguerite Vergnes at Institut National de la Santé et de la Recherche Médicale (INSERM) in Strasbourg (France) reported the spontaneous occurrence of spike-and-wave discharges (SWD) evocative of absence seizures in Wistar rats during cortical electroencephalographic (EE]) recordings. These seizures were recorded on both sides of the brain, lasted about 20 sec and occurred when the animals were quiet. Importantly, SWD were always associated with a typical "arrest" of the rats' behavior with twitching of the vibrissae. In addition, drugs used in the clinic to stop absence seizures (ethosuccimide, valproate) suppressed SWDs in these rats, whereas those that aggravate these seizures in patients (carbamazepine, phenytoine), increased rats' seizures.

Development of two strains 
These initial observations led to the development of two breeding colonies: 
(i) a fully inbred strain of rats, with 100% of animals displaying the EEG and behavioral characteristics of absence seizures, derived from an outbred Wistar colony and called the Genetic Absence Epilepsy Rats from Strasbourg (GAERS) 
(ii) a strain of non epileptic control animals selected from the same initial breeding colony of Wistar rats and called the NEC.
Since then, the GAERS has been recognized as a very predictive model for absence epilepsy, along with the WAG/Rij rat model.
The colony, initially developed in Strasbourg (France), is maintained at the University of Grenoble Alpes (France) under Inserm licence.

Effects of antiepileptic drugs

The reactivity of GAERS to antiepileptic drugs is unique since it perfectly matches with the effects of these drugs in patients with typical absence epilepsy

The following table summarizes the effects of the different antiepileptic that were tested on GAERS:

Genetic transmission and chromosomal mapping

In GAERS x NEC F1 generation, more than 95% of the animals showed SWDs after 6 months, suggesting a dominant transmission. Similar SWDs were recorded in males and females, indicating that the transmission is autosomal. Inter-individual variability suggested that the inheritance of SWDs is not due to a single gene locus and/or that environmental effects might play a role. This mode of inheritance was confirmed in F2 (F1 x F1) and backcross (F1 x control) generations. When F2 population was generated by breeding GAERS with Brown Norway rats, a polygenic inheritance of SWD-related phenotypes was shown and three quantitative trait loci were identified that could control different variables of SWDs (e.g., frequency, amplitude, duration). In this study, the age of the animals was found to be a major factor influencing the detection of genetic linkage to the various components of the SWDs. 
The development of two inbred strains from the same initial colony has appeared as a very powerful tool to study the possible mutations involved in a genetically complex idiopathic epilepsy. A functional mutation in the Cacna1h gene encoding the Cav3.2 low-voltage activated Ca2+ channel was found using the two strains. In addition, the effect is due to a gain-of-function splice variant mutation, and is semi-dominant, explaining about 20% of the phenotypic variance in the cross. In heterologous expression studies, it was shown that the GAERS splice variant allele on Cav3.2 conferred faster recovery from channel inactivation and greater charge transference during high-frequency bursts. This is in agreement with a previous study that showed a selective increase in the T-type conductance in GAERS nRT neurons. It is also in line with the role of the low voltage activated Ca2+ channel in thalamic burst firing and genetic data in human patients.

References

Electroencephalography